The 2019 CEBL Entry Draft was the inaugural CEBL Entry Draft, held on March 23, 2019, at the Art Gallery of Hamilton in Hamilton, Ontario. Six Canadian Elite Basketball League (CEBL) teams selected 78 athletes in total.

Format
A blind draw was used to determine the draft order for the first round. A "snake draft" was used, with the order reversing in even-numbered rounds, and the original order in odd-numbered rounds. The draft order for the first round was drawn as follows:
 Fraser Valley Bandits
 Edmonton Stingers
 Guelph Nighthawks
 Saskatchewan Rattlers
 Hamilton Honey Badgers
 Niagara River Lions

The first four rounds were regional rounds, in which teams selected players from their region. The three eastern teams had to choose players from Eastern Canada and the western teams from Western Canada. The next seven rounds were open rounds, with teams able to select players from any region of the world. The final two rounds were U Sports rounds, in which teams selected players playing in U Sports, Canada's university basketball program.

Player selection
Source:

Regional rounds

Round 1

Round 2

Round 3

Round 4

Open rounds

Round 5

Round 6

Round 7

Round 8

Round 9

Round 10

Round 11

U-Sports rounds

Round 12

Round 13

References

Canadian Elite Basketball League
2018–19 in Canadian basketball